Matthias Meyer is a German evolutionary geneticist working primarily with ancient DNA. Meyer is the leader of the Advanced DNA sequencing techniques group at the Max Planck Institute for Evolutionary Anthropology.

Research
Meyer has developed methods that have improved the scope of DNA sequencing, including methods for indexing of sequencing libraries of double-stranded DNA and extraction of highly degraded DNA from sediments. His work has been instrumental for the generation of the first high-quality genome sequences from archaic humans as well as the recovery of the oldest DNA sequences known to date from fossils not discovered in permafrost.

References

German geneticists
Year of birth missing (living people)
Living people
Max Planck Institute for Evolutionary Anthropology